Body Language is a 1992 American television film written and directed by Arthur Allan Seidelman. The thriller, starring Heather Locklear as a successful business executive and Linda Purl as her assistant who is trying to take over her life, was produced for USA Network, and was released on VHS in 1998.

Cast
Heather Locklear as Betsy Frieze
Linda Purl as Norma Suffield
James Acheson as Victor
Edward Albert as Charles Stella

Production
The film was shot in Portland, Oregon.

Reception
The New York Times wrote: "With two screenwriters, you'd think that the producers could have come up with something less contrived and cliched."

References

External links
 
 

1992 television films
1992 films
1990s English-language films
Films about identity theft
Films shot in Portland, Oregon
USA Network original films
1992 thriller films
Films directed by Arthur Allan Seidelman
American thriller television films
1990s American films